Adrian Nicholas (4 March 1962 – 17 September 2005) was a British skydiver who completed more than 8,000 jumps in 30 countries.

He is best known for his successful test in July 2000 of Leonardo da Vinci's (1452–1519) parachute design, proving it to be in retrospect the world's first working parachute. A modified pyramidal design was later also successfully tested by his Swiss colleague Olivier Vietti-Teppa.

World records

During the attempt the exhaust valve of his oxygen mask froze preventing him from breathing properly for about four minutes.

Death

On 17 September 2005 Nicholas was jumping in Texel, the Netherlands. He attempted to correct the situation by releasing his main parachute, however, he still hit the ground hard enough that he died at the scene as a result of his injuries.

References

External links 
 
Times Online: Adrian Nicholas (obituary)
 
Dropzone.com: Fatality Incident Discussion

1962 births
2005 deaths
British skydivers
Parachuting deaths
People educated at Aldenham School
Place of birth missing